Brushstroke was a Japanese kaiseki restaurant located on Hudson Street in Manhattan, New York City. The owners of the restaurant were French chef David Bouley and Yoshiki Tsuji, who is president of Tsuji culinary school in Osaka Japan. Sushi Ichimura at brushstroke was opened inside of the restaurant Brushstoke in 2012. They employed the head chef Tokyo-trained Eiji Ichimura, who has been cooking sushi for over 40 years.

Closing
Eiji Ichimura left the restaurant in November 2016. The restaurant closed down on September 29, 2018.

References

External links
 

2011 establishments in New York City
Japanese-American culture in New York City
Japanese restaurants in the United States
Defunct Japanese restaurants
Restaurants established in 2011
Restaurants in Manhattan
Defunct restaurants in New York City
Tribeca
Restaurants disestablished in 2018
2018 disestablishments in New York (state)